Minuteflag was an experimental jam band collaboration between members of the American punk bands Minutemen and Black Flag. Their only release, an EP, consists entirely of instrumentals with the exception of "Fetch the Water" which features D. Boon on lead vocals.

Recording took place in March 1985, while Black Flag was in the process of writing and recording Loose Nut at Total Access Studio in Redondo Beach, CA; Minutemen had just completed their Project: Mersh 12" EP at the same studio the month before. The members involved initially agreed that the material recorded during the Minuteflag sessions would not be released until at least one of the bands had disbanded. A 12" EP on SST Records as SST 050 came out over a year afterward, by which time Minutemen had disbanded after the car crash death of guitarist/vocalist D. Boon; Black Flag themselves would split up later in 1986.

Track listing
"Fetch the Water" – 3:49
"Power Failure" – 3:43
"Friends" – 5:12
"Candy Rush" – 1:49

Personnel
D. Boon – vocals, guitar
Greg Ginn – guitar
George Hurley – bongos, bean can
Kira Roessler – bass
Henry Rollins – backing vocals
Bill Stevenson – drums
Mike Watt – bass

References

SST Records artists
1986 EPs
Black Flag (band) EPs
Minutemen (band) albums
SST Records EPs
Collaborative albums
Rock music supergroups